Arthur C. Greene (January 22, 1881 – June 10, 1958) served three consecutive terms in the Iowa House of Representatives.

Early life and education
Greene was born in Denison, Iowa. He was educated in Denison schools, and graduated from Denison Normal and Business College.

Greene went to work in his father's brickyard business, and was later a partner.

Public service
Greene served six years as an alderman in Denison. He then served as Night Marshall, and was elected County Sheriff in 1919.

He was elected to the Iowa House of Representatives from Crawford County, where he served three consecutive terms. Greene was Chair of the Fish and Game Committee, and a member of the Judiciary Committee, Agricultural Committee, Social Security Committee, Conservation Committee, Mines and Mining Committee, and National Defense Committee.

In retirement, Greene served with the Iowa State Patrol in Dennison.

Personal life
Greene married in 1903, and he and his wife had five children.

Greene was a member of the Iowa Knights of Pythias, the Iowa Improved Order of Red Men, and a member of the Methodist church.

References

Republican Party members of the Iowa House of Representatives
People from Denison, Iowa
1881 births
1958 deaths
Iowa sheriffs
20th-century American politicians